A dystopia is a community or society that is in some important way undesirable or frightening.

Dystopia may also refer to:
Dystopia (video game), a 2005 Source Game Engine modification
Dystopia (band), a sludge metal/crust punk band
Dystopia (Babes in Toyland album) (1994)
Dystopia (Beneath the Massacre album) (2008)
Dystopia (Dystopia album) (2008)
Dystopia (Iced Earth album) (2011) or its title track
Dystopia (Megadeth album) (2016)
Dystopia (Midnight Juggernauts album) (2007) or its title track
Dystopia (song), a song by Megadeth,
"Dystopia", a song by Kreator from Enemy of God

See also
Dystopia canthorum